Doberan Abbey (Kloster Doberan) is a former Cistercian monastery in Bad Doberan, Mecklenburg-Vorpommern, Germany. The Brick Gothic church continues in use as Doberan Minster (Doberaner Münster).

After the conversion to Christianity of the Wendish prince Pribislav, Doberan was the first monastery founded in Mecklenburg, in 1171, as a daughter house of Amelungsborn Abbey. The first community, at Althof, was massacred in 1179 in the unrest following the death of Pribislaw, and the abbey was re-founded in 1186 in Doberan. It quickly became a political, social and spiritual centre in the region. The abbey church, which continues in use as Doberan Minster (Doberaner Münster), is one of the most important Brick Gothic buildings in Mecklenburg-Vorpommern. Until the Reformation, during which it was secularised in 1552, the abbey possessed great estates, and was the burial place of the Princes of Mecklenburg.

The premises were badly damaged in 1637 during the Thirty Years' War, when the minster was used as a storage depot, and some buildings were destroyed. During the French occupation of Mecklenburg under Napoleon from 1806 to 1813 more damage was sustained, and the church was again used as an ammunition dump. Between 1883 and 1896 the church was "restored" in an inappropriate 19th century Gothic Revival style, which was undone in a further restoration in the 1960s and 1970s.

Burials 
Albert of Sweden
Margaret Sambiria
Magnus II, Duke of Mecklenburg

References
 Bülow, Ernst von, 2006: Doberan und seine Geschichte. Godewind Verlag. 
 Compart, Friedrich, 2004: Geschichte des Klosters Doberan (reprint of the original edition of 1872). Godewind Verlag. 
 Erdmann, Wolfgang, 1995: Zisterzienser-Abtei Doberan. Kult und Kunst (Die blauen Bücher). Königstein/Taunus. 
 Fründt, Edith, 1987 (2nd ed. 1989): Das Kloster Doberan, with photographs by Thomas Helms. Berlin. 
 Gloede, Günter, 1960 (2nd ed. 1965, 6th ed. 1970): Das Doberaner Münster. Geschichte, Baugeschichte, Kunstwerke. Berlin
 Minneker, Ilka, 2007: Vom Kloster zur Residenz – Dynastische Memoria und Repräsentation im spätmittelalterlichen und frühneuzeitlichen Mecklenburg. Münster: Rhema-Verlag

External links 

Doberaner Münster website 

Monasteries in Mecklenburg-Western Pomerania
Cistercian monasteries in Germany
Brick Gothic
Bad Doberan
Buildings and structures in Rostock (district)